1803 in sports describes the year's events in world sport.

Boxing
Events
 English champion Jem Belcher loses an eye following an injury sustained in a fives match.  He retires from boxing but returns later.

Cricket
Events
 Thomas Howard makes his debut in first-class cricket.
England
 Most runs – Lord Frederick Beauclerk 284 (HS 74)
 Most wickets – Lord Frederick Beauclerk 12

Horse racing
England
 The Derby – Ditto
 The Oaks – Theophania
 St Leger Stakes – Remembrancer

References

 
1803